"Transitions" is the fourth episode of the fifth season of the HBO original series The Wire. The episode was written by Ed Burns from a story by David Simon & Ed Burns and was directed by Dan Attias, who won the Directors Guild of America Award for Outstanding Directing – Drama Series for the episode. It first aired on January 27, 2008.

Plot

At Michael's corner, Kenard places a brown paper bag under a step. Officer Anthony Colicchio and his partner observe the scene from their patrol car nearby and decide to move in. Once Colicchio has handcuffed the crew and called in back-up, he puts his hand in the bag expecting to find drugs. When he withdraws it, he is holding dog excrement. As a furious Colicchio puts the crew into a transport van, a queue of traffic develops. One motorist inflames Colicchio's anger by requesting that they move the cars, causing Colicchio to assault him. Sergeant Ellis Carver helps restrain Colicchio. Michael is later signed out of custody by his mother, and he refuses her request for money.

The following day, Carver informs Colicchio that his victim was a school teacher and that the incident is being looked into by Internal Affairs. When Colicchio shows no remorse over his actions, Carver decides that he will charge Colicchio himself. Later, Carver meets with his old partner Herc, who tries to argue Colicchio's case and insists that Carver cannot turn against his own men despite his closeness to making rank. Reminding Herc of their past experience with Randy Wagstaff, Carver explains that everything they do matters. Herc compares Colicchio's situation to his own and wonders if Carver thought that his own dismissal was fair. Carver doesn't answer and Herc admits that it probably was justified. Herc warns Carver that he will face a bad reputation, but encourages him to do the right thing.

Sydnor is frustrated when he discovers that an $80,000 withdrawal from Senator Davis' account was used to pay back his mother-in-law for a loan. Freamon learns that the loan was for a mortgage down payment, which means that Davis has broken federal law by lying on a mortgage application and claiming her money as his own. Freamon and Pearlman meet with Bond, who is hesitant to make the case federal. Speaking alone with Pearlman, Bond believes that with a ten-year penalty for each of the four lesser counts of theft, a conviction on local charges will be sufficient. Davis visits the courthouse for a secret grand jury hearing, where he denounces the enquiry and refuses to answer further questions. As he leaves the courthouse, Davis denies wrongdoing to a throng of reporters. Freamon realizes that Bond leaked the hearing to the press in order to raise his own profile.

Daniels meets with Commissioner Burrell and denies any role in Burrell's firing, offering to decline his planned promotion; Burrell simply gives him the silent treatment. Meanwhile, Mayor Carcetti holds a meeting in his office with his senior staff and is forced to make concessions to the ministers to smooth Daniels' transition to commissioner. During a meeting with Campbell, Burrell reveals that the FBI investigated Daniels for skimming drug money, threatening to expose him if Burrell is forced to resign. Campbell warns Burrell against this and promises a lucrative job if he leaves quietly. Campbell takes and peruses the FBI file. She urges Carcetti to secure her job offer to Burrell, arguing that it is necessary to ensure that Burrell does not damage the reputation of his former subordinates.

Prior to the press conference announcing Burrell's departure, Rawls visits his office. Burrell expresses bitterness towards the city's politicians, acknowledging that he may have been a bad commissioner but that his failings were the fault of schizophrenic policies from City Hall. Burrell warns Rawls to expect more of the same treatment as acting commissioner. At the press conference, Daniels again tries to reassure Burrell that he did not ask for the promotion. Burrell reminds Daniels that he once called his bluff about exposing his past and claims that he no longer remembers the details of the FBI file as it was so long ago.

At The Baltimore Sun, Templeton tells Alma that he is being interviewed for a junior position at The Washington Post. During his interview, Templeton is introduced to a senior Post editor named Ed, who critiques his "wrought" prose. Remarking that the Sun often beats the Post to breaking stories from Annapolis, Ed asks Templeton if he was involved in a story on ground rent; Templeton admits he was not. Templeton leaves the interview with an assurance that his resume will be kept on file. He declines the opportunity to sit in on a Post budget meeting despite his earlier request.

Alma learns about Burrell's rumored departure from a source, which others on the Suns metro team are unable to confirm. Gus is worried that they will not have enough to run their story, but outgoing police reporter Roger Twigg places one last call to a police department source  Stan Valchek  to confirm the rumor.
As the newsroom watches the press conference, Gus expresses disappointment that Twigg's departure, caused by the recent cutbacks, will cut them off from the department sources. Alma replaces Twigg as senior police reporter. Cutbacks are also blamed when the Sun misses the story of Davis' grand jury hearing, as the paper has recently lost its city court reporter.

McNulty visits the medical examiner's office and researches the locations where unclaimed homeless deaths have occurred, seeing that an overwhelming number of bodies are found in the Southern District at night. McNulty calls Freamon to advise him of the findings and suggests that they need a contact in the Southern night shift. Freamon and McNulty visit Southern District headquarters and learn that Freamon's old patrol partner, Oscar Requer, is listed on the night shift. The detectives approach Requer and ask him to notify them of any male homeless deaths in the district. Requer realizes they are looking to open a homicide file and agrees to help them with no further questions asked. When McNulty expresses surprise that Requer was willing to help them, Freamon explains that Requer was unfairly reassigned from Homicide after correctly asserting his authority over Rawls at a crime scene.

The next day Detective Ed Norris breakfasts with Sergeant Jay Landsman. Landsman recites the story from the paper about Burrell's forced retirement and the plan for Rawls to take over temporarily while Daniels is groomed for the job. Landsman jokes that he feels "dissed" that he was not considered and guesses that Daniels will be commissioner before the year ends. Bunk Moreland arrives with a report about the vacant murders and Landsman places it straight into his desk drawer. Bunk is upset that Landsman is ignoring his reports and Landsman points out that Bunk is just changing the date and submitting essentially the same report. Bunk angrily asserts that he is forced to repeat his requests as he is still waiting for the crime lab to process evidence on 14 of the 22 vacant murder scenes. As Bunk leaves Landsman's office, McNulty facetiously shows him that he is working on finding links between the homeless murders. Bunk is annoyed at McNulty's scheme and curses at him before leaving. Greggs arrives and remarks on Bunk's mood and McNulty tells her that Bunk is surprisingly emotional despite his gruff veneer. Greggs is about to go and interview the survivor of her home invasion case.

Later, through a 2-way mirror, Greggs watches Devonne, the child from the home invasion, with a psychiatrist. Devonne is extremely withdrawn and does not engage with toys or the psychiatrists. Greggs calls her ex-partner Cheryl and asks to see her son Elijah. She apologizes for the time that has passed and they set a meeting for the following day. The psychiatrist tells Greggs that Devonne remains too withdrawn to revisit the event.

Greggs spends the next afternoon with Elijah at Cheryl's apartment. Elijah is content coloring and does not answer Greggs' questions. She manages to get the boy to engage in building a Lego house with her.

McNulty and Freamon canvass an area where the homeless gather at night. McNulty is dubious of the need for actual canvassing on their false case. Freamon believes that it is still worth doing the work even on their false case as it will make their office reports seem true and verifiable and protect them from the potential consequences of their plan. McNulty complains that he was working on the case in the squad room and that Landsman barely noticed but Freamon reminds him that if their plan works the case will attract more interest and sloppiness could be their downfall. McNulty attempts to question a few people. One man is too busy as he is preparing for work, another calls him aside to ask for a card. Among the homeless is ex-checker from the docks Johnny "Fifty" Spamanto.

Requer hears a call about a dead body and responds that he will attend. He contacts McNulty who is already at a bar. McNulty attends the scene and finds the decedent too far gone for their plan. Requer imposes the first officer's report on McNulty in return for finding bodies for him.

McNulty returns home and tries to cover his drinking with mouthwash. Beadie Russell awakes and questions his whereabouts earlier. He tells her that he was called on a suspicious death and she is dubious because he was assigned to the day shift. He claims that he will now be called on any death potentially related to his serial killer. Russell asks where they called him as he did not return home after his shift and he admits to being at a bar. She tells him that she can smell the alcohol. She reminds him of the strength of their relationship and tells him that she used to not believe people when they warned her about his self-destructive behaviour. McNulty's phone rings and he readies himself to leave. He tells Russell he is chasing a serial killer and she tells him he is chasing more than that. She tells him not to return if he doesn't want to be there.

McNulty arrives at the scene and fakes another strangulation to fit with the pattern he has established. Freamon arrives as McNulty repositions the body to encourage the appearance of the bruising that indicates strangulation. McNulty discards drug paraphernalia to conceal overdose as the actual cause of death. McNulty fakes defence wounds by cutting the decedent's hands and Freamon calls him twisted. McNulty reminds Freamon of his idea to use the dentures and Freamon claims that he is basing the plan on actual serial killers and the way they mature from brutal killings to elaborate and ornate ones. McNulty asks Freamon never to tell his mother or his priest what he has done and Freamon promises to take it to his grave.

New Day Co-Op
Joseph "Proposition Joe" Stewart and Slim Charles visit Pearson's florist to arrange for flowers to be sent to the funeral of Butchie. Joe tells the florist that Butchie was a careful and subtle player in the drug dealing game and asks for the card to say "Butchie, woe to them that call evil good, and good evil. From your true and loyal friend Proposition Joe". Outside Slim Charles worries that the flowers and card will not deter Butchie's friend Omar Little from seeking revenge. Slim Charles next asks about Marlo Stanfield, who was responsible for Butchie's murder as a ploy to lure Omar back to Baltimore. Joe tells Slim Charles that he does not blame Stanfield for his situation but instead whoever told Stanfield about Butchie's connection to Omar. Prop Joe correctly suggests that his nephew Melvin "Cheese" Wagstaff is responsible but tells Slim Charles that he will not act without confirmation. Joe plans to go into hiding, leaving Cheese in charge and have Slim Charles watch Cheese to see if he spends the money he would have received for the information.

Stanfield meets with drug trafficker Spiros Vondas at Johnny's Diner having delivered a gift of clean money to try and ingratiate himself with Vondas and his organization "The Greeks" and usurp their business relationship with Prop Joe. Vondas explains that he has to return the clean money just as he did earlier with the dirty money. He tells Stanfield that he can see that he is an honorable man but that he does not want to make new street level contacts in Baltimore or undermine their relationship with Prop Joe. Chris Partlow observes the meeting, and unbeknownst to Stanfield, The Greek himself sits at the counter. Stanfield counters by reminding Vondas that Prop Joe was robbed by Omar. He suggests that having contact with him would act as an insurance policy against future robberies for all parties. The Greek reveals himself by interrupting and telling Vondas that Stanfield has a good point. He tells Stanfield that they will accept his offer of insurance as they live in volatile times and cannot predict the future. Stanfield leaves the case and asks Vondas to put it towards their travel expenses.

After Stanfield leaves The Greek tells Vondas that Stanfield has demonstrated that declining his offer would not prevent him from coming back. Vondas remarks that Stanfield is not Prop Joe and The Greek agrees.

Prop Joe chairs a meeting of the New Day Co-Op. In attendance are Stanfield, Slim Charles, Cheese and drug kingpins Philboy, Ghost, Hungry Man and Ricardo "Fatface Rick" Hendrix. Hendrix tells the other drug dealers about his property deals with the city council and how he expects to clear a million dollars for relocating his club. Hendrix plans to continue to invest in property and sell it for a profit as gentrification progresses. Hungry Man interjects that Milton is pursuing a similar scheme and using a prisoner reentry program to repair houses. Stanfield angrily tells the older men that they are wasting his time and asks Prop Joe if there is any more business. Slim Charles offers the floor to Hungry Man who describes a grievance involving Cheese and the division of new territory in Baltimore County. Cheese is furious and insults Hungry Man. Joe intercedes and warns Cheese that he is out of line as he is not a charter member of the Co-Op. Joe reassures Hungry Man that Cheese will respect the agreed boundaries and calls the meeting to an end. Cheese storms out of the room while Stanfield watches. After the meeting, Stanfield shows Prop Joe that he has received the funds that Joe helped him to launder. Stanfield asks Joe what they can do next and Joe offers to open another door for him. He asks Stanfield to focus on working with others and Stanfield thanks him for his advice.

That night Partlow takes Cheese to an abandoned building. Inside Snoop guards a bound and distressed Hungry Man. Partlow tells Cheese that it is a gift from Stanfield. Partlow pointedly explains the benefits of giving and receiving favours.

The next day Prop Joe takes Stanfield to the offices of defense attorney Maurice Levy. Stanfield recognizes Levy's name as he was Avon Barksdale's attorney. Prop Joe tells Stanfield that Levy is the attorney of many Co-Op members (including himself, Fatface Rick and Philboy). Inside, Levy greets his clients and his investigator Thomas "Herc" Hauk recognizes Stanfield as an old target. Stanfield asks Herc about a camera he once stole from him and Herc bitterly admits that the incident cost him his job. Stanfield is amused and Levy moves the meeting into the conference room. Joe waits in Levy's office and reads part of Herc's paper with his consent. Herc remarks on the Burrell story and Joe tells him that Burrell was in the year before him at Dunbar High School and reveals that Burrell was in the glee club and “stone stupid.”

Cheese helps Prop Joe to prepare to leave town. Cheese wonders why Joe has kept his house for so long considering his fortune and Joe explains that his grandfather bought the house and was the first African American in the neighborhood to do so. Cheese goes to wait outside. Prop Joe warns Cheese about the return of Omar and Cheese tells Joe not to worry about him. After Cheese leaves, Stanfield enters. Joe realizes that Stanfield is not there to see him off and blames Cheese for giving him up, Stanfield confirms his suspicion with a nod. Prop Joe tells Stanfield that Cheese was always a disappointment and reminds Stanfield that he has treated him like a son. Stanfield tells Joe that he "wasn’t made to play the son." Joe suggests that killing him would mean losing the connection to his traffickers but Stanfield tells him the Greeks have accepted the idea. Partlow emerges from behind Joe and Joe finally proposes leaving town and disappearing but Stanfield believes that Joe would soon be plotting against him. Stanfield tells Joe to close his eyes and assures him that it will not hurt. Joe does so and Stanfield nods to Partlow who fires a single shot into the back of Joe's head as Stanfield looks on.

Omar Little
Omar visits the home of one of Butchie's former bodyguards. Inside Big Guy is recovering from his leg wound after being left alive as a witness to Butchie's torture and murder. Big Guy retells the story for Omar's benefit and identifies Chris Partlow and Snoop as responsible. Omar vows "I’m going to work them. Sweet Jesus, I’m going to work them." Butchie's friend, Donnie insists upon accompanying Omar as he is more familiar with the Stanfield Organization. Omar reclaims his shotgun.

Omar waits for Slim Charles to return to his apartment. Omar asks Slim for Prop Joe's location. Slim refuses to answer and Omar strikes him on the back of the head with his gun. Slim falls to the floor and asks Omar to consider why Joe would have given up Butchie when he was aware it would bring Omar's vengeance upon him and that Butchie could implicate Prop Joe in profiting from Omar's robbery. Slim claims that he would help Omar if Joe had given up Butchie but that was not the case. He appeals to Omar to finish it but Omar leaves without further violence. Slim leans against the wall and finds blood on the back of his head.

Omar and Donnie observe Stanfield's courtyard from a vacant building. Stanfield is nowhere to be seen. They discuss Stanfield's awareness of their intentions and Omar reveals that he plans to attack Stanfield's people until Stanfield is forced to confront them himself. Donnie points out Monk as Stanfield's lieutenant and Omar agrees to target him and makes a note of his car.

First appearancesOscar Requer': Freamon's former partner in the patrol division and an ex-homicide detective. Requer was kicked out of Homicide after pulling rank over an Area Chief at the scene of a murder. It is subsequently revealed that the Area Chief was William Rawls, who retaliated by transferring Oscar to the midnight shift in the Southern District. A retired homicide detective with the same surname provided inspiration for the character of Bunk Moreland on the show.

Production

Guest stars

Frankie Faison as Ervin Burrell
Amy Ryan as Beatrice "Beadie" Russell
Paul Ben-Victor as Spiros "Vondas" Vondopoulos
Robert F. Chew as Proposition Joe
Bill Raymond as The Greek
Delaney Williams as Jay Landsman
Marlyne Afflack as Nerese Campbell
Benjamin Busch as Anthony Colicchio
Anwan Glover as Slim Charles
Felicia Pearson as Felicia "Snoop" Pearson
Method Man as Melvin "Cheese" Wagstaff
Duane Chandler Rawlings as Hungry Man
Dion Graham as Rupert Bond
Melanie Nicholls-King as Cheryl
Frederick Strother as Odell Watkins
David Costabile as Thomas Klebanow
Shamika Cotton as Raylene Lee
Sam Freed as James Whiting
Bobby Brown as Bobby Brown
Ed Norris as Ed Norris
Roscoe Orman as Oscar Requer
Michael Salconi as Michael Santangelo
Bruce Kirkpatrick as Roger Twigg
Donald Neal as Jay Spry
Todd Scofield as Jeff Price
William F. Zorzi as Bill Zorzi
Jeffrey Pratt Gordon as Johnny "Fifty" Spamanto
Curtis L. McClarin as Florist
Jeff Roberts as Homeless Employed Man
Ptolemy Slocum as Homeless Business Card Man
John Badila as Sun Staff Member
Valerie Leonard as Washington Post Editor
Jayne Miller as TV news journalist
Jerry B. Whiddon as Washington Post Editor
Miriam Hyman as Social Worker
Nathan James as Western DEU Officer
Tim R. McAdams as Motorist
Joey Perillo as Medical Examiner
Alan J. Wendl as Southern District Desk Sergeant
Larry Andrews as Donnie
Sho "Swordsman" Brown as Phil Boy
Thuliso Dingall as Kenard
Edward Green as Spider
Derrick Purvey as Big Guy
Troj Marquis Strickland as Ricardo "Fat-Face Rick" Hendrix

Uncredited appearances
Mike D. Anderson as Ghost
Thomas J. McCarthy as Tim Phelps
Kwame Patterson as Monk Metcalf
Brandon Young as Mike Fletcher

References

External links
"Transitions" at HBO.com

The Wire (season 5) episodes
2008 American television episodes
Television episodes directed by Dan Attias